Neave is a surname. Notable people with the surname include:

 Airey Neave (1916–1979), British soldier, barrister and politician assassinated by a car bomb
 Alida Neave, South African tennis player who reached the doubles finals in the 1929 French championship
 Bruce Neave (born 1949), Australian footballer
 Caroline Neave (1781–1863), British philanthropist and penal reformer
 Colin Neave (born 1943), Australian business executive
 David Neave (1883–1???), Scottish footballer
 Diana Neave (1919–1992), English baroness
 Dorina Neave (1880–1955), British author
 Geordie Neave (fl. 1895–1896), English footballer
 Guy Neave (born 1941), British social scientist and professor
 Julius Neave (1919–2008), English insurance executive
 Lizzie Neave (born 1987), British slalom canoeist in women's kayak; 2009 world champion
 Marcia Neave (born 1944), judge of the Supreme Court of Victoria (Australia) and academic
 Mark Neave (born 1980), English cricketer
 Sir Richard Neave, 1st Baronet (1731–1814), British merchant and a Governor of the Bank of England
 Richard Neave (born c. 1936), forensic artist
 Rikki Neave (1988–1994), English male murder victim
 Sheffield Airey Neave (1879–1961), British naturalist and entomologist
 Sheffield Neave (1799–1868), English merchant and Governor of the Bank of England 
 Victoria Neave (born 1980), American attorney and politician
 William Neave (c.1662–1713), Irish barrister, politician and law officer

See also
Neaves